Gina Martin is a British political activist and author. She is known for her case to make upskirting illegal in England and Wales, which resulted in the Voyeurism (Offences) Act 2019. Martin also authored a book, Be the Change: A Toolkit for the Activist in You, and rejected a nomination for an award of an Order of the British Empire in 2020.

Activism 
In June 2017, Martin was attending the British Summer Time Festival in Hyde Park when she discovered that a man had taken a picture of her underwear from under her skirt. She took his phone to the police, who told her the act wasn't illegal and therefore they couldn't take any action. After posting about the incident on Facebook, her story went viral and an online petition was started to reopen her case. The petition received more than 100,000 signatures, and Martin began campaigning to change the law with pro-bono representation from associate lawyer Ryan Whelan of Gibson Dunn & Crutcher LLP. Martin campaigned while working a full-time job, and received a large amount of online harassment, including hundreds of rape threats.

In March 2018, along with Gina and Ryan, MP Wera Hobhouse tabled a Private Members Bill to make upskirting a criminal offence. The bill was blocked on second reading by Conservative MP Christopher Chope. In response, The Ministry of Justice backed the anti-upskirting campaign by tabling a Government bill that was eventually approved by the House of Lords in February 2019 and the Voyeurism (Offences) Act 2019 came into force in April the same year.

Since her campaign, Martin has written for Grazia, The World Economic Forum, The Guardian, Glamour, and The Daily Telegraph, and in June 2019 published a book on activism titled Be the Change: A Toolkit for the Activist in You. Martin is also an ambassador for UN Women. She hosts a radio show called Gina's Gamechangers on BBC Radio 5 Live, and the podcast Might Delete Later with her sister Stevie Martin.

In 2019, Martin was included in the BBC's 100 Women list, and the Time 100 Next list as well as Stylist Remarkable Women Gamechanger Award and Disruptor of the Year at the Cosmopolitan Magazine Influencer Awards.

Martin worked pro-bono for model Nyome Nicholas-Williams to campaign against Instagram's nudity policy after the platform was accused of censorship for deleting images of Nicholas-Williams from the site while retaining similar images of white women, resulting in an official change to their nudity policy on breast squeezing.

Martin rejected an offer to be nominated for an Order of the British Empire in 2020, writing on Twitter that it would be "deeply hypocritical" to accept the honour "while continuing to be vocal in my commitment to anti-racism and understanding the deep and unsettling race issues the British empire has built into the foundation of our country and many others” and cited concerns about the "violence and oppression" of the British Empire.

Personal life 
Martin is originally from Liverpool.

References 

Living people
British activists
British writers
British women podcasters
People from Liverpool
Year of birth missing (living people)
BBC 100 Women